The 1998 Volta a la Comunitat Valenciana was the 56th edition of the Volta a la Comunitat Valenciana road cycling stage race, which was held from 24 February to 28 February 1998. The race started in Calpe and finished in Valencia. The race was won by Pascal Chanteur of the  team.

General classification

References

Volta a la Comunitat Valenciana
Volta a la Comunitat Valenciana
Volta a la Comunitat Valenciana